Michael Lombardi (born June 19, 1959) is an American football executive and media analyst. Until 2016, he was an assistant to the coaching staff of the New England Patriots and is a former analyst for the NFL Network and sportswriter at NFL.com. Lombardi also previously served as an NFL executive with the San Francisco 49ers, Cleveland Browns, Philadelphia Eagles, and Oakland Raiders. He hosts his own podcast "The GM Shuffle" formerly with Adnan Virk now with Femi Abebefe, and co-hosts a Saturday morning sports betting program on Sirius XM for Vegas Stats & Information Network along with a daily show on Vegas Stats & Information Network called "The Lombardi Line".

Life and career

Early life

Lombardi grew up in Ocean City, New Jersey and played both baseball and football at Valley Forge Military Academy. He attended Hofstra University from 1977–1981, where he played defensive lineman and long snapper for the football team.

Early career

In 1981, Lombardi was hired as a recruiting coordinator at the University of Nevada, Las Vegas by Rebels' head coach Harvey Hyde.

National Football League

Lombardi began his NFL career in 1984 as an area scout under Bill Walsh of the San Francisco 49ers, where he stayed until 1987. He is credited for the initial discovery and scouting of Hall of Famer Charles Haley, who was drafted by San Francisco 49ers in 1986 NFL Draft.

Lombardi joined the Cleveland Browns organization as Pro Personnel Director in 1987. Later, he became the Browns' Director of Player Personnel and worked under head coach Bill Belichick managing drafts, negotiating contracts and acquiring free agents.

In 1997, Philadelphia Eagles President Joe Banner hired Lombardi as a consultant to assist with the 1997 NFL Draft. Banner then named Lombardi Director of Pro Personnel of the Eagles in 1998.

Later that same year, Al Davis hired Lombardi to serve as Senior Personnel Executive of the Oakland Raiders, a position which he held until 2007. During his tenure with the Raiders, Oakland won three consecutive AFC West titles and advanced to Super Bowl XXXVII.

In October 2012, sportswriter Jason La Canfora reported that the Cleveland Browns were considering Lombardi for their vacancy at General Manager. He was hired for that position five months later. On February 11, 2014, the Browns replaced Lombardi with Ray Farmer.

In 2014 and 2015, Lombardi worked under Bill Belichick of the New England Patriots as an assistant to the coaching staff. Speaking about Lombardi's time in New England, Belichick said, "Mike's...one of the smartest people I've worked with. He was huge asset to me for the two years he was here...he studies football and he knows it very well."

Lombardi has worked as an administrator in the NFL for over 30 years and has worked for Bill Walsh, Al Davis and Bill Belichick. Sports and pop culture essayist Chuck Klosterman described Lombardi as, "a detail freak and a polymath, or at least a person successfully attempting to impersonate one" after spending time with him at the Cleveland Browns facility in the hours leading up to the 2013 NFL Draft. Lombardi has also been described as, "one of the most quiet but influential executives in the NFL." He has been credited as one of the first NFL executives to study the science of scouting players for moral character.

Broadcasting

As a broadcaster, Lombardi has worked for ESPN, CBS Sports, Showtime, the NFL Network and Fox Sports. He began his career as a member of the media in 1996 when he spent part of that year as an NFL draft analyst for ESPN. He also spent portions of 1998 and 1999 as an editorial consultant and studio analyst for CBS Sports as on-air talent for the NFL Today pre-game show.

In 2008, Lombardi joined NFL Films' Inside the NFL, a weekly Showtime series where he provided analysis alongside host James Brown and former NFL players Cris Collinsworth, Phil Simms and Warren Sapp. That same year, Lombardi began contributing to several NFL Network shows, including as an in-studio analyst and reporting live from individual games.

Lombardi was hired by Fox Sports in September 2016. When he joined Fox, national networks president Jamie Horowitz said in a statement, "Michael is a thought-provoking and insightful football analyst with an impressive résumé. We feel like his blunt approach and original perspective makes the FS1 shows more interesting, and the fans of those shows more informed."

Digital media

In 2010, after working as on-air talent at the NFL Network for two years, Lombardi began writing columns for NFL.com, duties he performed until 2012. Lombardi has also contributed writing to Sports Illustrated and the National Football Post, the latter of which he founded and served as editor-in-chief for three years. In January 2017, Lombardi took a position with The Ringer where he hosted the "GM Street" podcast with Tate Frazier and also wrote articles on occasion for the website. He announced via Twitter in March 2019 that he had left The Ringer to work on his own podcast. He currently hosts The GM Shuffle podcast with Femi Abebefe and co-hosts a program for Vegas Stats & Information Network.

In September 2017, Mike Lombardi made headlines by criticizing Philadelphia Eagles coach Doug Pederson: "He might be less qualified to coach a team than anyone I’ve ever seen in my 30-plus years in the NFL."  Pederson would lead the Eagles to their first Super Bowl championship later that season.

In 2020, Lombardi became a co-host on Hammer Dahn, a gambling podcast from Pat McAfee Inc.

Writing
Lombardi has written one book, Gridiron Genius: A Master Class in Winning Championships and Building Dynasties in the NFL, published in September 2018.

Personal life

Lombardi is not related to Green Bay Packers coaching legend Vince Lombardi. He is an avid reader with an interest in Robert Caro's biography of Lyndon B. Johnson. He and his wife, Millie, have two sons: Matt, who is the Assistant quarterbacks coach for the Carolina Panthers; and Mick, who has been the offensive coordinator for the Las Vegas Raiders since the 2022 season.

References

1959 births
Living people
People from Ocean City, New Jersey
Sportspeople from Cape May County, New Jersey
Players of American football from New Jersey
Hofstra Pride football players
Coaches of American football from New Jersey
UNLV Rebels football coaches
San Francisco 49ers scouts
Cleveland Browns scouts
Cleveland Browns executives
Philadelphia Eagles executives
Oakland Raiders executives
National Football League general managers
New England Patriots coaches
American sportswriters
National Football League announcers
Arena football announcers